Borogop is a village in the commune of Djohong in the Adamawa Region of Cameroon, near the border with the Central African Republic.

Population 
In 1967, Borogop contained 124 inhabitants, mainly Wodaabe

In the 2005 census, 853 people were counted there.

References

Bibliography
 Jean Boutrais, 1993, Peuples et cultures de l'Adamaoua (Cameroun) : actes du colloque de Ngaoundéré du 14 au 16 janvier 1992, Paris : Éd. de l'ORSTOM u.a.
 Dictionnaire des villages de l'Adamaoua, ONAREST, Yaoundé, October 1974, 133 p.

External links
 Djohong , on the website Communes et villes unies du Cameroun (CVUC)

Populated places in Adamawa Region